Alvin Ainsley Corneal (born 13 October 1937, San Juan, Trinidad and Tobago) is a Trinidad and Tobago former footballer. Corneal also played three unofficial matches with Barbados in 1962 when the latter was not yet a FIFA member. He also played 40 matches of first-class cricket for Trinidad and Tobago and other Trinidad teams between 1959 and 1977 as an opening batsman.

See also
 List of association footballers who have been capped for two senior national teams

References

External links
 Alvin Corneal at CricketArchive

1937 births
Living people
Trinidad and Tobago footballers
Trinidad and Tobago international footballers
Association football forwards
Trinidad and Tobago cricketers
East Trinidad cricketers
Dual internationalists (football)
Pan American Games medalists in football
Pan American Games bronze medalists for Trinidad and Tobago
Footballers at the 1967 Pan American Games
Medalists at the 1967 Pan American Games